The Samyang 7.5mm F3.5 UMC Fisheye MFT is an interchangeable camera lens by Samyang for Micro Four Thirds systems. It is a manual focus lens.

References

http://www.dpreview.com/products/samyang/lenses/samyang_7p5_3p5/specifications

External links

007.5
Fisheye lenses